Wadd: The Life & Times of John C. Holmes is a 1998 documentary about adult film icon John C. Holmes produced and directed by Cass Paley. It was the winner of Best Feature Documentary at the 1999 South by Southwest Film Festival held annually in Austin, Texas.

Synopsis 
Documentary about the enemies, friends, and family of adult film icon John C. Holmes and their memories of him. It discusses the creation of the Johnny Wadd film series directed by Bob Chinn. It also covers the romantic relationships of John Holmes with first wife Sharon Holmes, his underage mistress Dawn Schiller, and his second wife, the porn actress Misty Dawn. Finally, it covers Eddie Nash and Wonderland murders, as well as Holmes' death from AIDS. It is narrated principally by journalist Mike Sager, whose Rolling Stone story "The Devil and John Holmes" inspired the films Boogie Nights and Wonderland. It has been reformatted in HD for redistribution by The Sager Group LLC.

Interviews
 Bunny Bleu
 Aunt Peg
 Candida Royale
 Kitten Natividad
 Misty Dawn
 Ron Jeremy
 John Leslie
 Don Fernando
 Bob Chinn
 Paul Thomas Anderson
 Larry Flynt
 Sharon Gebenini Holmes
 Bill Amerson
 Mike Sager
 Richard Pacheco
 Al Goldstein
 Seka
 Gloria Leonard
 Annette Haven
 Bobby Hollander
 Sharon Mitchell
 Bill Margold

Critical reception 
Owen Gleiberman of Entertainment Weekly wrote, "Often, there's a conspiracy aspect to lost legends, but terrific films do fall through the cracks. Wadd: The Life & Times of John C. Holmes, which played the Toronto film festival and then slipped away, is the ultimate searching - and shocking - exposé of the porn world."

Richard Corliss of Time wrote of the film, "Like Holmes, Wadd is seedy, twisted, a bit on the long side--and creepily fascinating."

Stephen Holden of The New York Times wrote, "Wadd leaves us to ponder the difference between Holmes's special 'gift' and, say, another star's beautiful singing voice. When you come right down to it, they're pretty much the same thing, but distributed to different parts of the body."

Maitland McDonagh of TV Guide commented, "Holmes's story isn't pretty, but it's fascinating, in no small part because the people Paley interviews offer a glimpse into a brief time when making porn was an act of rebellion that attracted a diverse and eccentric group of filmmakers and performers."

References

External links

American documentary films
1998 films
Documentary films about American pornography
Films credited to Alan Smithee
1998 documentary films
1990s English-language films
1990s American films